The Battle of Bloody Gulch took place around the Manoir de Donville or Hill 30 (U.S. Army designation), approximately  southwest of Carentan in Normandy, France, on June 13, 1944.

It involved elements of the German 17th SS Panzergrenadier Division and 6th Fallschirmjäger Regiment, and the American 501st, 502nd and 506th Parachute Infantry Regiments (PIR) of the 101st Airborne Division, reinforced by elements of the 2nd Armored Division and the 29th Infantry Division.

During the battle, the manor house of Manoir de Donville was the headquarters of the German forces. American soldiers nicknamed the road running past the manor "Bloody Gulch", after a place mentioned in the popular western movie Destry Rides Again.

Battle 
When the 101st Airborne entered the town of Carentan on June 12, 1944, after heavy fighting on the two previous days, they met relatively light resistance. The bulk of the surviving German defenders (from the 6th Fallschirmjäger Regiment) had withdrawn to the southwest the previous night after a heavy Allied naval and artillery bombardment. Both sides realized the importance of the town: for the Americans, it was a link between Utah Beach and Omaha Beach and would provide a base for further attacks deeper into German-occupied France. For the Germans, recapturing Carentan would be the first step towards driving a wedge between the two American landing beaches, severely disrupting and possibly even repulsing the Allied invasion.

The remnants of the 6th Fallschirmjäger resupplied and were reinforced by assault guns and panzergrenadiers of the 17th SS Panzergrenadier Division on the night of June 12–13. The combined force counterattacked northeast towards Carentan at dawn on June 13, just as the 506th and 501st PIR were attacking southwest to enlarge the American defensive perimeter around the town. The 506th took the brunt of the attack, and by 10:30 a.m., the outnumbered and outgunned paratroopers were pushed almost back to the outskirts of the town.

Under intense German fire, F Company of the 506th's left flank broke and fell back. This exposed D Company's right flank. That company also fell back, leaving E Company all alone. Cpt. Thomas P. Mulvey, the commanding officer of F Company, was relieved on the spot by the battalion commander.

When a German tank attempted to penetrate the left flank, two soldiers (according to the Band of Brothers, they were Lt. Harry Welsh and Pvt. McGrath) of E Company successfully destroyed it with a bazooka. Meanwhile, battalion headquarters stopped the retreat of D and F companies, pushing them forward  to cover the left flank. The 2nd Battalion of the 502nd PIR took up positions to the right of the 506th, but by 1:00 p.m. they too had suffered many casualties, and the German attack was on the verge of breaking through their defenses.

At this critical point, sixty tanks from Combat Command A of the 2nd Armored Division and accompanied by infantry of the 29th Division, counterattacked southwest from Carentan at 4:30 p.m., inflicting severe casualties on the Germans and forcing them to withdraw with the loss of four tanks. The American victory led to the linkup of forces from Utah and Omaha Beaches, creating a secure lodgement area for further American operations.

The actions of the 507th Parachute Infantry Regiment during the Graignes incident (better known as the Battle of Graignes) south-east of Carentan, played a part in the successful capture of Carentan and the Battle of Bloody Gulch. Had the mis-dropped paratroopers of the 507th not stopped the advance of the 17th SS Panzergrenadier Division, it is possible that the German division could have made it to Carentan before the 101st Airborne Division. Furthermore, the 507th caused the Germans significant losses in the few days that they held Graignes and this likely influenced the Battle of Bloody Gulch.

In popular culture 
Band of Brothers, an HBO miniseries, features the battle in its third episode, "Carentan", portraying the 506th PIR's part in the battle.

The battle was also featured in the first two Brothers in Arms video games.

References

Further reading

External links 
 "The Battle of Bloody Gulch" (near the bottom of the page) – www.101airborneww2.com

1944 in France
Bloody Gulch
Bloody Gulch
History of Manche
Bloody Gulch
June 1944 events